Bomar, also known as Jordan, is an unincorporated community in Cherokee County, Alabama, United States.

History
A post office was established at Bomar in 1890, and operated until being discontinued in 1907. The community was named in honor of Dr. Richard R. Bomar.

References

Unincorporated communities in Cherokee County, Alabama
Unincorporated communities in Alabama